The Frontbench of Arthur Calwell was the opposition Australian Labor Party frontbench of Australia from 7 March 1960 to 8 February 1967, opposing the Liberal-Country Coalition government.

Arthur Calwell became Leader of the Opposition upon his election as leader of the Australian Labor Party on 7 March 1960, and headed up the Australian Labor Party Caucus Executive until 1967.

Caucus Executive (1960-1962)
The following were members of the ALP Caucus Executive from 7 March 1960 to 19 February 1962:
 Hon. Arthur Calwell  - Leader of the Opposition and Leader of the Labor Party
 Gough Whitlam   - Deputy Leader of the Opposition and Deputy Leader of the Labor Party
 Senator Hon. Nick McKenna - Leader of the Opposition in the Senate
 Senator Hon. Pat Kennelly - Deputy Leader of the Opposition in the Senate
 Dr Jim Cairns  (from May 1960)
 Lance Barnard 
 Clyde Cameron 
 Hon. Percy Clarey  (to 17 May 1960)
 Senator Hon. Ben Courtice
 Frank Crean 
 Allan Fraser 
 Jim Harrison 
 Les Haylen 
 Hon. Reg Pollard 
 Hon. Eddie Ward

Caucus Executive (1962-1964)
The following were members of the ALP Caucus Executive from 19 February 1962 to 24 February 1964:
 Hon. Arthur Calwell  - Leader of the Opposition and Leader of the Labor Party
 Gough Whitlam   - Deputy Leader of the Opposition and Deputy Leader of the Labor Party
 Senator Hon. Nick McKenna - Leader of the Opposition in the Senate
 Senator Hon. Pat Kennelly - Deputy Leader of the Opposition in the Senate
 Kim Beazley Sr. 
 Clyde Cameron 
 Frank Crean 
 Fred Daly  (from August 1963)
 Allan Fraser 
 Jim Harrison 
 Les Haylen 
 Tony Luchetti 
 Hon. Reg Pollard 
 Hon. Bill Riordan 
 Hon. Eddie Ward  (to 31 July 1963)

Caucus Executive (1964-1967)
The following were members of the ALP Caucus Executive from 24 February 1964 to 8 February 1967:
 Hon. Arthur Calwell  - Leader of the Opposition and Leader of the Labor Party
 Gough Whitlam   - Deputy Leader of the Opposition and Deputy Leader of the Labor Party
 Senator Hon. Nick McKenna - Leader of the Opposition in the Senate (to August 1966)
 Senator Don Willesee - Leader of the Opposition in the Senate (from 17 August 1966)
 Senator Hon. Pat Kennelly - Deputy Leader of the Opposition in the Senate
 Kim Beazley Sr. 
 Dr Jim Cairns 
 Clyde Cameron 
 Frank Crean 
 Fred Daly 
 Allan Fraser 
 Pat Galvin 
 Tony Luchetti 
 Hon. Reg Pollard 
 Harry Webb

See also
 Frontbench of H. V. Evatt
 Shadow Ministry of Gough Whitlam (1967–72)
 Eighth Menzies Ministry
 Ninth Menzies Ministry
 Tenth Menzies Ministry
 Second Gorton Ministry
 First Holt Ministry
 Second Holt Ministry

References

Australian Labor Party
Calwell
Opposition of Australia